1+9+8+2 (official title in other sources as 1982), is the fifteenth studio album by the English rock band Status Quo, released on 16 April 1982. It was the first to include new drummer Pete Kircher, who had recently replaced John Coghlan, and also the first to credit keyboard player Andy Bown as a full member of the band; on the previous few releases he had merely been listed as a guest musician although he had long been an integral member in all but name.

Its release came shortly before the band appeared at a concert at the National Exhibition Centre, Birmingham, in the presence of the then Prince of Wales (later King Charles III), and the resulting publicity probably helped to send it to an entry position of No. 1 in the album chart, making it their fourth and last No. 1 album. Nevertheless, it received a lukewarm reception from fans. "Dear John", the first single and the only track not written by any of the band, reached No. 10 in the UK, but "She Don't Fool Me" stalled at No. 36.

1982 was the 20th anniversary of band members Francis Rossi and Alan Lancaster first meeting each other, and the sum of the numbers 1+9+8+2 is 20 (shown as the Roman numerals 'XX' underneath the album title), hence the name of the album.

Track listing
Side one

Side two

2006 reissue bonus tracks

The two live tracks also appeared on the album Live at the N.E.C., released later the same year.

September 2018 Deluxe Edition CD2
Track 1 was a B-side. 
The remainder of the disc is a rehearsal recording, with the group trying out some cover songs.

"Calling the Shots" – B-Side 	 
"Break the Rules" 	 
"When the Girl in Your Arms (Is the Girl in Your Heart)"	 
"Half-Way to Paradise"	 
"Cathy's Clown" 	 
"It's Only Make Believe" 	 
"Walk on By" 	 
"Singing the Blues" 	 
"Jealous Heart" 	 
"Down the Dustpipe" 	 
"Wild Side of Life" 	 
"Lover Please" / "Let's Twist Again" / "Rock 'N' Roll Music" 	 
"He'll Have to Go" / "Pictures of Matchstick Men" 	 
"Unspoken Words" 
"Blueberry Hill" 
"Gimme Some Lovin'"	 
"Time to Fly" / "Railroad" 	 
"Umleitung" 	 
"Someone's Learning" 	 
"It Doesn't Matter Anymore"
"Red River Rock"
"Like a Good Girl" / "Mean Girl" 	 
"Stay the Night"

Personnel
Status Quo
Francis Rossi – lead guitar, vocals
Rick Parfitt – rhythm guitar, vocals
Alan Lancaster – bass, vocals
Andy Bown – keyboard, backing vocals
Pete Kircher – drums, percussion

Additional personnel
Bernie Frost – backing vocals

Chart positions

Certifications

References

External links
Official Status Quo Website

1982 albums
Status Quo (band) albums
Vertigo Records albums